STEP (the Society of Trust and Estate Practitioners) was founded by George Tasker in 1991 and is the international professional body for advisers who specialise in inheritance and succession planning. Its members are mainly solicitors, barristers, attorneys, accountants, tax advisers, trust officers and trust administrators as well as banking and insurance professionals in the trust field.

Objectives
The main focus of the organisation is to promote high professional standards within the profession, to provide educational and networking opportunities for its members and to contribute to debate and public policy in its specialist field.

Membership
STEP has more than 100 branches and chapters in 56 countries with a current membership in excess of 20,000. It runs a number of educational programmes, from entry-level certificates to a full diploma. Accumulated credits from these qualifications and prior experience determine the level of membership. Only full STEP members can use the letters TEP after their name. The designation TEP after a member's name is the only widely recognised mark for professionals in the trust and estate administration industry.

All STEP members are subject to a Code of Professional Conduct requiring them at all times to act with integrity and in a manner that inspires the confidence, respect and trust of their clients and of the wider community. Members are also required to keep up to date with the latest legal, technical and regulatory developments.  STEP members who advise on tax matters are also required to abide by guidance in the Professional Conduct in Relation to Taxation, which includes an obligation on STEP members to not seek results contrary to the clear intention of Parliament.

Leadership
The president of STEP was Geoffrey Shindler OBE, who was appointed in November 2006. He is a UK qualified solicitor and one of the founder members of the organisation. The current Chair of STEP is Nancy Golding TEP, a practitioner based in Canada. She began her Chairmanship in January 2020. (STEP Council)

References

External links 

Legal organisations based in the United Kingdom
Wills and trusts in the United Kingdom
Solicitors
1991 establishments in the United Kingdom
Organizations established in 1991